BHX may refer to:
 Birmingham Airport, England (IATA airport code)
 BinHex, a binary-to-text encoding system 
 Binhai West railway station, China Railway pinyin code BHX